Muzo is a municipality in Boyacá, Colombia.

Muzo may also refer to:
 Muzo people, the indigenous people of this area before the Spanish conquest
 Muzo language
 Muzo Formation, Early Cretaceous formation cropping out near Muzo
 Muzo mine, emerald mine in the Muzo mining district